Qareh Aghaj (also Romanized as Qareh Āghāj, Qarā Āqāj, Qarah Āqāj, and Qareh Āqāj; also known as Karāghāch and Qarāqāch) is a village in Kharaqan-e Sharqi Rural District, Abgarm District, Avaj County, Qazvin Province, Iran. At the 2006 census, its population was 150, in 32 families.

References 

Populated places in Avaj County